A tetrafluoride is a chemical compound with four fluorines in its formula.

List of tetrafluorides
Argon tetrafluoride,  (hypothetical)
Berkelium tetrafluoride
Carbon tetrafluoride (tetrafluoromethane)
Diboron tetrafluoride, a colorless gas
Dinitrogen tetrafluoride (Tetrafluorohydrazine) 
Germanium tetrafluoride
Hafnium tetrafluoride
Iridium tetrafluoride
Krypton tetrafluoride,  (predicted)
Lead tetrafluoride
Manganese tetrafluoride
Mercury tetrafluoride
Molybdenum tetrafluoride
Niobium tetrafluoride
Oganesson tetrafluoride (predicted)
Oxygen tetrafluoride,  (hypothetical)
Palladium tetrafluoride
Platinum tetrafluoride 
Plutonium tetrafluoride
Polonium tetrafluoride decomposes via radiolysis.
Protactinium tetrafluoride
Radon tetrafluoride,  (predicted)
Selenium tetrafluoride, a liquid at standard conditions
Silicon tetrafluoride,  or Tetrafluorosilane
Sulfur tetrafluoride, a gas at standard conditions
Tellurium tetrafluoride, a stable, white, hygroscopic crystalline solid
Thionyl tetrafluoride
Thorium tetrafluoride
Tin tetrafluoride 
Titanium tetrafluoride 
Uranium tetrafluoride, a green crystalline solid
Vanadium tetrafluoride
Xenon tetrafluoride, 
Zirconium tetrafluoride

Ions
Some atoms can form a complex ion with four fluorine atoms which may form compounds containing the term tetrafluoride. Examples include
Tetrafluoroaluminate, 
Tetrafluoroberyllate, 
Tetrafluoroborate, 
Tetrafluoromagnesate, 
Tetrafluoroammonium,

See also
Fluorination by sulfur tetrafluoride produces organofluorine compounds from oxidized organic compounds, including alcohols, carbonyl compounds, alkyl halides, and others

References

Fluorides